Ghoray Shah, also known as Pir  Bahauddin Jhulan Shah Sarkar Shrine, is a famous Sufi shrine in Lahore city, Punjab, Pakistan it is located in old area of Lahore .  It is the burial place of a supposed 14th-century Sufi saint named Bahauddin Shah or Jhulan Shah.
Ghora in urdu called for Horse.People offer Horse toys made of clay that's why it is called Ghoray shah.
It is a much-visited place, where tourists come and make supplications and leave small horse figurines as offerings.

References

Cultural heritage sites in Punjab, Pakistan
Buildings and structures in Lahore
Sufi shrines in Pakistan
Shrines in Lahore